Trigonoptera maculata is a species of beetle in the family Cerambycidae. It was described by Perroud in 1855. It is known from Indonesia.

References

Tmesisternini
Beetles described in 1855